Bose Ogulu is a Nigerian academic, businesswoman and talent manager. She manages her son Burna Boy's musical career and thus is also known as Mama Burna.

Early life 
Ogulu is the daughter of Nigerian music critic Benson Idonije, who was the manager of Fela Kuti. With a Bachelor of Arts in foreign languages and a Masters of Arts in translation from University of Port Harcourt, Ogulu had a successful career as a translator for the Federation of West African Chambers of Commerce. She is fluent in English, French, German, Italian, and Yoruba. She then ran a language school called Language Bridges, where she organized cultural immersion trips for over 1,800 young people.

In addition, she taught French for a decade at the University of Education in Port Harcourt, retiring in 2018.

Career 

Ogulu manages the musical careers of her son Damini, who performs as Burna Boy and daughter Nissi Ogulu, who performs under her own name. She managed Burna Boy until 2014 and then became his manager again from 2017 onwards, gaining the nickname Mama Burna. She has collected awards for Burna Boy at various events, including the All Africa Music Awards, The Headies and the MTV Europe Music Award. When she heard that Burna Boy had won the 2019 MTV award for Best African Act, she interrupted his show to tell him.

When Burna Boy won four prizes at the 2018 Soundcity MVP Awards Festival, Ogulu represented him and caused a social media sensation by saying "Expect more madness". At the 2019 BET Awards in California, Ogulu stood in for her son to collect the award for Best International Act and gave a speech reminding African-Americans to remember "you were Africans before you became anything else" which resulted in a standing ovation.

Bose Ogulu is the founder & CEO of Spaceship Collective , the holding company to Spaceship Records (an entertainment label) and Spaceship Publishing (a publishing outfit).

Awards and nominations

References

Nigerian women in business
Living people
Music managers
Nigerian women educators
Year of birth missing (living people)